Whaletown is a settlement on Cortes Island, British Columbia, Canada. It is known as the gateway to Cortes Island. A public ferry links Whaletown to Heriot Bay on Quadra Island. It is featured in the 2013 Man Booker long-list work of fiction by author Ruth Ozeki, A Tale for the Time Being.

The Whaletown Water Aerodrome serves the town.

References

Populated places in the Strathcona Regional District
Cortes Island
Ferry transport in British Columbia